The University of Guadalajara is a public higher education institution in the Mexican city of Guadalajara. The university has several high schools as well as graduate and undergraduate campuses, which are distributed all over the state of Jalisco, Mexico. It is regarded as the most significant university in the state. Chronologically, based on its foundation, is the second oldest in Mexico, the seventeenth in North America and the fourteenth in Latin America.

Since 1994, the university works through a network model to organize its academic activities. This university network is integrated by 15 university centers, the Virtual University System, the High School Education System and the general administrative body of the university. During 2014–2015 the total number of enrolled students is 255,944 of which 116,424 belong to graduate and undergraduate students and 139,520 to high school students.

History

The Royal University of Guadalajara (1791–1821) 

At the time of its foundation in 1586 College began offering higher education in Guadalajara, and as a result, it was the first institution that granted academic degrees. The first one who requested to establish a university in Guadalajara was Friar Felipe Galindo y Chavez who, in 1696, asked the King Charles II of Spain to increase the range of the recently founded Royal Seminary of San Jose. This way, a long century of arrangements to found the University of Guadalajara began. Chronologically, the second oldest in Mexico, the seventeenth in North America, and the fourteenth in Latin America.

The proposition of Friar Felipe was reconsidered by the lawyer Matias Angel de la Mota Padilla, who, in 1750, was able to involve the Guadalajara's city hall into the project. However, it was only after the banishment of all Company of Jesus' members from all Spain's territories in 1767, when the need of a university in the region of Nueva Galicia was relevant. This occurred because the Company of Jesus managed the two most important colleges in the city: the Santo Tomas College and the San Juan Bautista College. Moreover, on December 12, 1771, arrived to Guadalajara the new bishop to Nueva Galicia, Friar Antonio Alcalde y Barriga, who significantly supported the foundation of the university. In 1775 the Friar replied a grit from King Charles III of Spain, who consulted him about the convenience of establishing a university in Nueva Galicia. The answer of the Friar was completely positive, so on November 18, 1791, the King Charles IV of Spain enacted a royal grit where he proclaims the foundation of the Royal University of Guadalajara.

This grit arrived to the authorities in Nueva Galicia on March 26, 1792, who proceeded to celebrate and quickly revamp the said Santo Tomas College. Therefore, the university was founded on November 3, 1792. By mutual agreement between the Friar Antonio Alcalde and the president of the Royal Audience, Jacobo Ugarte de Loyola, Jose Maria Gomez y Villaseñor was named as the first Rector of the university. Academically speaking, the university was first composed by the Art, Theology, Law and Medicine Faculties.

The Confrontation between the University of Guadalajara and the Institute of Sciences of the Jalisco State (1821–1861) 

The university adhered itself to the Agustin de Iturbide's Plan of Iguala, with which the Independence of Mexico was concluded, as a result the university kept its royal status. However, it came to be imperial when the first Mexican Empire of Agustin I was proclaimed, but then when the Republic was established it became a national university.

On January 16, 1826, during the administration of Jose Cesareo de la Rosa as the Rector, the Jalisco State Congress proclaimed the first enclosed order to the University of Guadalajara and then the State's Governor, Prisciliano Sanchez Padilla, reestablish the Institute of Sciences. However, on September 1, 1834, the State's Governor, José Antonio Romero, declared the first reopening of the university and the closing of the Institute of Sciences. Nevertheless, thirteen years later, in 1847, the State Congress proclaimed the Public Teaching Program by which the University of Guadalajara as well as the San Juan Bautista College would be closed, furthermore it'd also reestablish the Institute of Sciences and found two high schools, namely the Boys' Lyceum and the Ladies' Lyceum. Yet the Program was not executed since Mariano Hurtado convinced the State's Governor, Joaquin Angulo, not to do so. As a result, in that same year, it was proclaimed that the Institute of Sciences and the University of Guadalajara would coexist, although the latter would lose its finances and headquarters. Fortunately, a later State's Governor, Jose Maria Yañez Carillo, proclaimed 1853 the assimilation of the Institute of Sciences into the University of Guadalajara, so the later recovered its traditional patrimony.

At the time the Plan of Ayutla got the triumph around 1855, the State's Governor, Jose Santos Degollado proclaimed the second enclosed order to the university and the reestablishment of the Institute of Sciences. However, during the Reform War, on February 2, 1859, the Governor and Commander of the Jalisco State, Leonardo Marquez, reestablish the University of Guadalajara.

Despite that, following the military success of the liberal wing in 1860, the State's Governor, Pedro Ogazon, proclaimed the third enclosed order to the university which also proclaimed the reestablishment of the Institute of Sciences, the Boys' Lyceum and the Ladies' Lyceum.

The University Interregnum (1861–1925) 
During this period the higher and high school education both came to be totally dominated by the Government of Jalisco which triggered the emergence of private schools. Besides, the Medicine, Law and Engineering Schools, as well as the Boys' Lyceum and the Ladies' Lyceum continued teaching higher and high school education as a result of the governmental support that they received, except from some governors as Ramon Corona and Manuel Macario Dieguez, since the latter closed the Lyceums and founded the Preparatoria Jalisco in 1914.

The University of Guadalajara (1925–1989) 

Derived from the worries that many intellectuals and artists manifested in the reunions at the "Centro Bohemio," the conference given by the engineer Juan Salvador Agraz Ramirez de Prado about a project to establish the "National University of Guadalajara" and the new orientations that the Mexican Revolution brought about in 1910, the Jalisco State's Governor, Jose Guadalupe Zuno Hernandez, reopened the University of Guadalajara by third time in 1925 and named Enrique Diaz de Leon as its Rector. Therefore, the study plans for high schools and faculties, as well as the Organic Law were elaborated and then approved by the State Congress on September 7, 1925. In the first meeting of the University Council the motto of the university was chosen: “Piensa y Trabaja" (Think and Work).

In the First Congress of Universities that took place at Mexico City, the Rector Diaz de Leon supported the socialist education, but when he tried to carry it out in Guadalajara, several student's protests happened. As a result of the protests the Governor, Sebastian Allende decided to close the University of Guadalajara again. However, to prevent the Autonomous University of Guadalajara to take the historic name of University of Guadalajara, the State Congress reopened the university and named Constancio Hernandez Alvirde as its twenty ninth Rector.

The Jalisco University Network (1989–present) 
During this period the need to create a modern, efficient, qualified and eco-friendly university was recognized, however, this meant a change in the academic and administrative structure of the university would be necessary. This purposes were established in the Institutional Development Programme: A Future Vision, presented in 1989 by the Rector Raul Padilla Lopez, who is regarded for accomplishing the modernization the university. In this document, the aims and programs of all, teaching, researching and extension areas were established, which were based on a series of projected indicators to 1995.

Additionally, on September 2, 1989, the General University Council approved the document “Bases for the discussion about the Reform of the University of Guadalajara,” which had a current diagnostic about the university and proposed to decentralize the services and functions of the institution all across its entities. Also, some elements as the updating and creation of study plans, the expansion of research and graduate studies, the promotion of cultural and sports activities as well as the diversification of its financial funds were presented in the document. This reform took place when the State Congress approved the new Organic Law of the University of Guadalajara. In this, the autonomy of the university in matters as the academic planning and the financial administration was acknowledged. In that same year the thematic and regional university campuses were created and the High School Education System was established.

Moreover, the Labor Union of the Academic Workers of the University of Guadalajara was created and the Labor Union of University Workers got enhanced, the Union of University Students was established as well. Among other changes derived from the creation of the University Network, it is important to mention the creation of the Virtual University System and the University System of Radio, Television and Cinematography.

In 2014, with Itzcoatl Tonatiuh Bravo Padilla as the Rector of the university, the Institutional Development Programme was updated with projections to 2030. Besides, the arrangements to build a new regional university campus located in Zapotlanejo, Jalisco began.  At present the University Network is located in each region of Jalisco and has campuses in 109 of 125 municipalities in the State.

University government

General University Council 
The General University Council is the most significant government body of the university. It is integrated by 186 members, presided by the General Rector and constituted by students, academics and headmasters. Each year the students and academics representatives in the General University Council are chosen through direct and secret suffrage of its pairs.

General Rector 
The General Rector is the most important executive authority of the university, it is also its legal representative and president of the General University Council and the Rectors' Council. The Rector is chosen by the vote of the members of the General University Council and stays in office for six years, beginning the first day of April.

Rectors' Council 
This council is the body that plans and coordinates the whole University Network and is constituted by the General Rector, who presides it, the Executive Vice-Rector, the general secretary, the headmasters of each university campuses, the headmaster of the Virtual University System and the headmaster of the High School Education System.

Campuses of the University of Guadalajara 
Currently, the University of Guadalajara has fifteen undergraduate and graduate campuses; from this, six specialize in different areas of study and are located in the Guadalajara Metropolitan Area and eight, called regionals, are located in different regions of the State of Jalisco. 
Thematic 
CUAAD – University Center of Art, Architecture and Design
CUCBA – University Center of Biological and Agricultural Sciences 
CUCEA – University Center of Economic and Managerial Sciences 
CUCEI – University Center of Exact Sciences and Engineering
CUCS – University Center of Health Sciences
CUCSH – University Center of Social Sciences and Humanities

Regional 
CUAltos – located in Tepatitlán de Morelos
CUCienega – located in Ocotlán, La Barca and Atotonilco el Alto
CUCosta – located in Puerto Vallarta and Tomatlán
CUCSur – located in Autlán
CULagos – located in Lagos de Moreno y San Juan de los Lagos
CUNorte – located in Colotlán
CUSur – located in Ciudad Guzmán
CUTonala – located in Tonalá
CUValles – located in Ameca

Mid-High Education System 
Also understandable as the Baccalaureate Education System by a literal translation from Spanish, is the branch of the University Network that executes instruction and diffusion on baccalaureate education since the institutional restructuration in 1994. In the 2015 A period it is integrated by 166 schools that are located in 109 municipalities of Jalisco. From this 166 schools there are: 24 metropolitan high schools, 36 regional high schools, 4 metropolitan offices, 78 regional offices and 24 regional extension centers. The total number of students registered in that same period is 135, 244, which study one of the 24 education options for high school. Moreover, the System is the responsible to supervise around one hundred incorporated high schools that are officially recognized by this body.   sems  Mid-High 
Metropolitan Baccalaureate Schools
Preparatoria Jalisco
High School No.2
High School No.3
High School No.4
High School No.5
High School No.6
High School No.7
High School No.8
High School No.9
High School No.10
High School No.11
High School No.12
High School No.13
High School No.14
High School No.15 
High School No.16
High School No.17
High School No.18
High School No.19
High School No.20
High School No.21
High School No.22
Tonalá High School
Northern Tonalá High School 
South Tonala High School
Polytechnic High School of Guadalajara
Jorge Matute Remus Polytechnic High School
Vocational High school
Regional Baccalaureate Schools
Ahualulco de Mercado Regional High School
Ameca Regional High School
Arandas Regional High School
Atotonilco Regional High School 
Autlán de Navarro Regional High School
Casimiro Castillo Regional High School
Chapala Regional High School
Cihuatlán Regional High School 
Ciudad Guzmán Regional High School
Colotlán Regional High School
Degollado Regional High School
El Grullo Regional High School
El Salto Regional High School
Etzatlán Regional High School
Jamay Regional High School
Huejuquilla el Alto Regional High School
Jalostotitlán Regional High School
Jocotepec Regional High School
La Barca Regional High School
Lagos de Moreno Regional High School
Ocotlán Regional High School
Puerto Vallarta Regional High School
San Juan de los Lagos Regional High School
San Martín de Hidalgo Regional High School
San Miguel el Alto Regional High School
 Regional High School
Sayula Regional High School
Tala Regional High School
Tamazula de Gordiano Regional High School
Tecolotlán Regional High School
Tepatitlán Regional High School
Tequila Regional High School
Tlajomulco de Zuñiga Regional High School
Toluquilla Regional High School
Tuxpan Regional High School
Villa Corona Regional High School
Unión de Tula Regional High School
Zacoalco de Torres Regional High School
Zapotiltic Regional High School
Zapotlanejo Regional High School
Wixárika School of Higher Education
 High School of San José del Valle de Tlajomulco de Zúñiga
Regional High School of Ahualulco de Mercado

Virtual University System 

The Virtual University System (VUS) -commonly known as UDGVirtual in Spanish is a decentralized body of the University of Guadalajara responsible to administrate and develop distance education programmes comprising mid-high education (baccalaureate by competencies online) as well as higher education (undergraduate and postgraduare curricula).

The VUS has a presence in 108 municipalities of Jalisco, the 32 federative entities of Mexico, and ten countries worldwide. There are 3,953 undergraduate and graduate students living in Mexico, from which 69% (2,768) reside In Jalisco. States that concentrate the highest enrollment, after Jalisco, are the State of Mexico, with 9% (349), and Mexico City with 4% (167). From all students in educational programs, 43 are abroad: 27 are in the United States, 4 in Ecuador, 3 in Colombia, 2 in Spain, 2 in Canada, and the rest of them in Bulgaria, Chile, Peru, Puerto Rico and the Dominican Republic. From 43 students residing abroad, 32 are Mexicans who reside in Bulgaria (1), Canada (2), Spain (2), United States (25), Puerto Rico (1), Dominican Republic (1). Among our school population are 28 students of foreign nationality, of whom 17 live in Mexico and other eleven study from their home countries.

Educational programmes 
Currently, the University of Guadalajara offers a significant number of educational programmes for high school, undergraduate and graduate education. Until the first period of 2015, the university offers the following educational programs:
30 High School Programmes
2 General High School 
11 Technologic High School
3 Middle Professional
11 Technical 
3 Technical Professional 
141 Undergraduate Programmess
108 Bachelor
33 High Technical
211 Graduate Programmes
63 Specialties
106 Masters
42 PhD's

Scientific research 
During 2014–2015, the university holds 1,640 researchers of which 852 are members of the National System of Researchers. Besides, the University of Guadalajara has several research institutes and centers, some of them are presented in the following section, distributed according to the university campus they belong:
CUAAD
Center of Metropolitan Studies
Institute of Studies about Historic Centers
Institute of Aesthetics Studies
CUCBA
Center of Ground Ecosystems Studies
Center of Molecular Genetics Studies
Institute of Animal Biotechnology
Institute of Botanics
Institute of Seed's Science and Technology
Institute of Cellular Physiology
Institute of Limnology
Institute of Management and Exploitation of Fitogenetic Resources 
Institute of Environment and Human Communities
Institute of Neurobiology
Institute of Neurosciences
CUCEA
Center of Social and Economic Studies
Center for the Quality and Innovation of Higher Education
Institute of Public Policies and Government Studies
Institute for the Development of Innovation and Technology in Small and Medium Enterprises
CUCEI
Institute of Astronomy and Meteorology
Institute of Seismic Engineering
CUCS
Institute of Chronic Degenerative Diseases
Institute of Biomedical Sciences Studies
Institute of Odontology Studies
Institute of Translational Neurosciences
CUCSH
Center of Gender Studies 
Center of Strategic Studies for the Development 
Center of North America Studies 
Institute of Innovation and Governance Studies 
CUCiénega 
Center of Design of the Business Incubator
Center of Innovation, Incubation and Design 
Institute of Genetics 
CUCSur
Manantlan Institute of Ecology and Biodiversity Preservation(IMECBIO)
CUCosta
Center of Western Seismology and Volcanology Studies
CULagos
Center of Psychological Support for the Community
CUSur
Center of Nourish Behavior and Nourishment Studies 
Research Center in Molecular Biology of Chronic Diseases (CIBIMEC)
CUTonalá
Institute of Water and Energy
CUValles
Center of Entrepreneurship and Incubation
Center of Nanosciences and Nanotechnologies Studies
VUS
Institute for Management of Knowledge and Apprenticeship through Virtual Environments

Scientific journals 
The university holds an important variety of scientific research journals, particularly five of these journals are included in the Scientific and Technologic Journals Index of the National Science and Technology Council. 
EconoQuantum: This journal of business and economics is published twice a year by the Department of Quantitative Methods of the Master in Economics of CUCEA. It aims to publish academic articles in English and Spanish through the use of quantitative methods in business and economics. 
Mexico and the Pacific Basin: Is a quarterly published journal founded in 1998 by the Department of Pacific Studies of CUCSH. Its articles cover topics related to the economy, international relations, politics, society and culture of the countries in the Asian Pacific region through an interdisciplinary approach.
Communication and Society: Biannually published, this journal specializes in the area of social communication and is integrated by national and international researches. It is published by the Department of Social Communication Studies of CUCSH.
Espiral. State and Society Studies: Is a quarterly published scientific research journal of the State and Society Division of CUCSH. It's opened to national and international social sciences researchers.
Apertura. Educational Innovation Journal: Is a scientific research journal published by the Virtual University System whose articles cover topics related to unconventional education practices based on the use of new communication and information technologies.

University chairs 
The university holds several chairs of free access to the university's community and the general public.
Émile Durkheim Chair
Fulbright-García Robles US Studies Chair 
Hugo Gutiérrez Vega Chair 
Jorge Alonso Chair
José Martí Chair
Julio Cortázar Latin American Chair
Primo Levi Chair
UNESCO Chairs: Derived from an UNESCO initiative approved in 1992, the aim of the UNESCO Chairs is to boost and improve the research and development programs of higher education through the creation of university networks. They also aim to foster the inter-university cooperation through knowledge sharing across boundaries. Currently, the University of Guadalajara holds four UNESCO Chairs:
Chair on Media and Information Literacy and Intercultural Dialog (held in CUCSH)
Chair on Gender, Leadership and Equity (held in CUCEA)
Chair on Equality and No Discrimination (held in CUCSH)
Chair on Youth (held in CUCEA)

University sports 
The University of Guadalajara has a large sports infrastructure for individual and group disciplines. The university is co-owner of the Jalisco Stadium and also holds a significant quantity of university teams and sports areas distributed across its campuses and high schools.

University Sports Complex 
In the complex's facilities, located in the area where CUCEI, the Vocational High School and the Polytechnic High School are located, several physical activities are offered to the university's community and the general public, namely: athletics, basketball, boxing, gymnastics, volleyball, swimming and diving.

UdeG Sports Club 
Located near La Primavera Forest, the club provide service to academics, administrators, students and the general public. It aims to provide an area to satisfy resting, recreation, physical training or cultural activities through its facilities which include: olympic pool, diving pit, football stadium, as well as tennis, basketball, racquetball, volleyball, squash fields, bicycle path, restaurant, camping area, among others.

Aquatic Center for Rehabilitation and Rescue 
The center has facilities for aquatic activities and physical training where services to internal and external users are offered. There are swimming courses offered to all ages, specialized in freestyle, diving and rescue, also physical training is offered with the support of trainers in a wide range of disciplines.

University of Guadalajara's Leones Negros 
The University of Guadalajara is the owner of the Leones Negros that currently compete in the Mexican "Ascenso" League. However, it was not until 2014 when, after 20 years away of the "Primera Division," that the Leones Negros got to ascend in the national league. Nonetheless, in the 2015 championship, the Leones Negros descended again to the "Ascenso" League. The team is itself an approach to the university's community with the aim to foster a sports culture within the university.

UDG Culture 
UDG Culture is the body of the University of Guadalajara dedicated to foster and spread the culture as well as every artistic representation. This body aims to provide areas that stimulate artistic creation and to generate social interaction platforms to develop and maintain the cultural and artistic representations. Currently, it collaborates with public, private, national, and international institutions, as well as culture creators groups, artistic promoters, civil organizations, social organizations and the campuses of the University of Guadalajara Network, all of which work together to create cultural projects that are generated by the Music, Performing Arts and Literature Divisions.

Folkloric Ballet of the University of Guadalajara 
After 1960 when several dancing couples organized to create a group that would represent the Visual Arts College, in 1966 the Rector, Ignacio Maciel Salcedo, name this group as the Folkloric Ballet of the University of Guadalajara. The Ballet aims to spread and maintain the Mexican cultural traditions expressed in music and dances by presenting in their choreographies a recreation of elements present in everyday life in several Mexican regions.
At present, the Ballet is composed of fifteen couples of dancers and twelve couples of singers. The resident group and the children's ballet are composed of the same number of dancers and singers. As a total, the Ballet has 168 artists trained in dance or music.

Editorial Universitaria 
Editorial Universitaria is the publishing house of the University of Guadalajara, which publishes academics texts, manuals, monographs, and a wide variety of books. Through the publishing of these, the Editorial aims to spread knowledge to enhance teaching and researching tendencies in the students and teachers of the university. Besides, since its publications reflect the institution's profile, it contributes to show the university's image to the society.

Guadalajara International Book Fair 
Created in 1987 by a University of Guadalajara's initiative, The Guadalajara International Book Fair is nowadays the biggest international book market for Spanish publications. Each year editors, literary agents, reading promoters, translators, book dealers and librarians attend looking for commercial and professional interactions. Besides, each year around 600 thousand people attend and during nine days enjoy one of the most important cultural fair of Latin America.

The Fair is also a significant opportunity to enhance the tides that bond Mexico and Hispano-America with other cultures. That is why, since 1993, the Fair has had a region or a country as a guest of honor which shows in this cultural platform the best of its publishing and artistic productions. Until now, the guests of honor have been: Colombia (1993), New Mexico (1994), Venezuela (1995), Canada (1996), Argentina (1997), Puerto Rico (1998), Chile (1999), Spain (2000), Brazil (2001), Cuba (2002), Quebec (2003), the Catalan Culture (2004), Peru (2005), Andalusia (2006), Colombia (2007), Italy (2008), Los Angeles (2009), Castile and Leon (2010), Germany (2011), Chile (2012), Israel (2013), Argentina (2014) and United Kingdom (2015).

Guadalajara International Film Festival 
The Guadalajara International Film Festival is the most important cinematographic event in Latin America because of the important initiatives it offers to the film industry. The Festival is a forum for training, instruction and creative exchange between professionals, international film critics and Hispanic students. 
The Festival is hosted by the University of Guadalajara, The Mexican Institute of Cinematography, the National Council for Culture and Arts, the Jalisco State Government, the Zapopan and Guadalajara City Halls and Cinépolis.

Papirolas Creative Festival for Youth and Children 
Papirolas begins in 1995 as a part of the Guadalajara International Book Fair with the aim to create an exclusive area for youth and children through interactive expositions and diverse artistic shows. Since 2010, Papirolas began to present expositions, then in 2011 it began offering training programs for teachers and cultural agents.

International Fair of Music Professionals 
This Fair emerges as a professional platform for the development of the Mexican and Latin American music industry. It holds several concerts, markets and conferences which are a meeting point for professionals in the industry like composers, musicians, audio engineers, record labels, producers, and editors.

Arts Museum (MUSA) 
With the aim to give the Jalisco's community an area of cultural presentations in a facility that holds important creations of the muralist José Clemente Orozco, the Rector of the University of Guadalajara, Raul Padilla Lopez, managed to use the ground floor of the General Rectory Building as a museum. In 1994, the area was enabled as a museum which until now has been house to many national and international contemporary art presentations of many artists. Besides, the museum has its own collection of Jalisco's contemporary art.

On February 28, 2013, the General University Council of the University of Guadalajara modified the use of the building known as the General Rectory Building to dedicate it completely to cultural representations. Following this, the name of the building changed to University of Guadalajara's Arts Museum.

Jorge Martinez Arts Laboratory 
The Arts Laboratory is a place that exhibits interdisciplinary arts that depends on the Arts and Humanities Division of CUAAD. This laboratory aims to boost projects that experiment with aesthetics through the creation of a critique forum of researching and collaboration among Division's students.

Diana Cultural Center 
The Diana Cultural Center, integrated by the Diana Theater and the Diana Studio, is a model for performing arts since it works with its own financial resources and the best service standards with a little financial aid from the University of Guadalajara. The Diana Theater opened in 2005, year in which 250 shows were offered. In 2014, 377 shows took place, the largest number in its history. After a decade of life, the theater has left a mark among the "tapatios" since it has had about 2 million and a half spectators in almost 3 thousand shows.

Cineforo 
The Cineforo is a space dedicated to show films that stands as an alternative for the people in Guadalajara that enjoy the seventh arte since it shows films that are not usually show in the commercial cinemas. It is located in the General Rectory Building of the University of Guadalajara and was inaugurated in 1988 by the Rector Javier Alfaro Anguiano. It has capacity for 440 people and its facilities have also been used to show theater, dancing and music performances. At present, the Cineforo is the principal cinema of the Guadalajara International Film Festival held each year.

Calle 2 
Since 2005, Calle 2 works as a multifunctional facility for entertainment. It is integrated by seven pavilions, two forums, three concourses and one arena. It can hold fairs, expositions, concerts, as well as social and sports events with a capacity for 80 thousand people.

Cavaret Studio Theater 
The Cavatet Studio Theater made it possible to cover the need that the Guadalajara Metropolitan Area had for facilities to host alternative shows of national and international reputation. This is a space for recreation, entertainment and production cultural and sports events, conventions, expositions and concerts of any genre.

Vivian Blumenthal Theater 
The Vivian Blumenthal Theater was created to get close and spread the large production of classic theater to the community. This cultural space is enabled to hold theater projects and many kind of music projects. It also represents a stimulation to the artistic and cultural activities in the city, since it allows the presentation of premium shows with the involvement of local, national and international productions. The theater is considered a significant scenario for multidisciplinary arts experimentation and proposals.

Jalisco's Experimental Theater 
The Jalisco's Experimental Theater, whose building was designed by the architect Eric Coufal, was opened up on December 6, 1960, and is part of the National Cultural Heritage. The theater is a cultural space built by the Jalisco State Government by the 50s. It is located inside of the Agua Azul Park and is property of the Jalisco State Government and managed by the University of Guadalajara.

University Cultural Center 
The University Cultural Center is the first university cultural complex of the mid-west region of Mexico which is currently in building process and located in the city of Zapopan in Jalisco. Here, the largest and most significant cultural space of the Guadalajara Metropolitan Area will be located since this project will be home to thousands of cultural and academic activities.

The University Cultural Center will articulate university campuses, arts schools, the media, thematic and archaeological parks, as well as the sports and residential areas. It is also home of the Telmex Auditorium, the Bicentenary Plaza and the "Juan Jose Arreola" Public Library of the Jalisco State, moreover there are two projects that are currently under their building process which are the Environmental Sciences Museum and the Performing Arts Complex.

"Juan Jose Arreola" Public Library of the Jalisco State 
The "Juan Jose Arreola" Public Library of the Jalisco State has the aim to preserve, guard and offer a free access to its large catalogue of contemporary and historic books. With the largest bibliography of the State and a huge quantity of historic documents (some with 500 years of history) the Library is a really important space for studying and researching. The Library depends on the University of Guadalajara since 1925. Since 1975, it was located in a part of the Jalisco House of Culture building. In 2001, the University General Council name it as the "Juan Jose Arreola" Public Library of the Jalisco State in memory of the writer who had been its headmaster since 1991 until his death in 2001.

In 2011, the bibliography and its collections were moved to a new building which is stands as the entrance of the University Culture Center. The new building of the Library owns around 3 million books which hold around 500 years of not only the Jalisco State, but also of Northern Mexico and the Southeast area of the United States of America.

Telmex Auditorium 
The Telmex Auditorium was founded on September 1, 2007, and is currently one of the most important shows areas in Latin America. The Auditorium, designed by the Mexican architect Jose de Arimatea Moyao, is located in the Guadalajara Metropolitan Area and is part of the most significant and transcendent cultural project of the University of Guadalajara which is the University Cultural Center.

Performing Arts Complex 
This project that will be opened up at the end of 2015 aims to boost the development of performing arts in the region. It will be composed by four halls and a scenario dedicated to present shows outdoors. This project will satisfy the need of local production and will be primarily used for theater. In its scenarios will be possible to present: opera, symphonic concerts, musical theatre, dance, films, visual arts and congresses. For instance, it can also be used for conferences and book presentations.

Center of Transdisciplinary Instrumentation and Services 
This project of the University of Guadalajara, whose building will be located at the University Cultural Center, will have four unites of microscopy, spectroscopy, molecular biology, proteomics and bioinformatics in which the classification of biological, medical, industrial and environmental samples will be possible. The objective of this center is to enhance the research work that about 400 researchers across the different campuses of the university already carry on.

Environmental Sciences Museum 
The Environmental Sciences Museum will be the first of its kind in Mexico which will devote to show natural and social environments of the region, the nation and the continent. Its aim is to show through an interesting way topics related to the environment, the nature, the culture and the sustainability of life on Earth.
It will be strongly attached to the regional identity of Jalisco that, along with Guadalajara, covers a design of five sustainability edges: ecology, economy, politics, culture and society. Besides, at the same time it will cover contemporary topics regarding the sustainability in the Guadalajara Metropolitan Area.

University System of Radio, Television and Cinematography

Channel 44 

Channel 44 UDGTV is a project of the University of Guadalajara that started to broadcast since 2011 after two decades of having initiated the arrangements to found its own TV channel. The channel has a cultural aim to spread programs through the four municipalities that integrate the Guadalajara Metropolitan Area. These are musical, cultural and informative programs.

University of Guadalajara Radio Network 
This is a project of the University of Guadalajara which is composed by eight radio stations that cover the mid-west region of Mexico with the aim to serve as a tide with the community. It is a cultural radio that supports cultural movements, local indie artists, and social and cultural diversity. The radio stations that integrate the University of Guadalajara Radio Network are:
Guadalajara XHUG 104.3 FM
Lagos de Moreno XHUGL 104.7 FM
Autlán XHAUT 102.3 FM
Ciudad Guzmán XHUGG 94.3 FM
Ocotlán XHUGO 107.9 FM
Colotlán XHUGC 104.7 FM
Puerto Vallarta XHUGP 104.3 FM
Ameca XHUGA 105.5 FM

Collaboration with the Guadalajara Civil Hospital 
The Guadalajara Civil Hospital is a health institution located in Guadalajara, Jalisco since the 17th century. It was founded in 1794 by the Guadalajara's Bishop, Fray Antonio Alcade y Barriga, as a partner institution of the University of Guadalajara. Since then, the hospital works as the hospital school of the university where students and academics of the health divisions perform professional practices and researches, respectively. At the present, the Civil Hospital, which is a decentralized body of the Jalisco State Government since 1997, holds two hospital units (the Friar Antonio Alcalde Hospital and the Dr. Juan I. Menchaca Hospital) which attend 29% of the Jalisco population. Its first building was the San Miguel de Belen Hospital, which was renamed, and is currently the Friar Antonio Alcalde Old Civil Hospital.

University of Guadalajara in Los Angeles (UDGLA) 
The university extends its reach and goes beyond boundaries to offer academic opportunities to Mexicans living in Los Angeles, creating, at the same time, bonds with their Latin American roots. UDGLA works so co-national migrants and Hispanics improve their quality of life and social integration by increasing their cultural knowledge and education through its cultural and academic projects.

Los Angeles Spanish-Language Book Fair (LéaLA) 
This event has the aim to promote Spanish-language books and the acknowledgment of the Latin American population, its culture and customs. LéaLA is an initiative supported by the University of Guadalajara in Los Angeles and the Guadalajara International Book Fair. This Fair offers presentations of Spanish-language books, conferences about culture and historic roots of Latin American countries, meetings of writers from Latin America and other regions, discussion forums about the problems of book sales and their distribution, participation of celebrities from the Latin American community in a variety of activities within the cultural and literary events, all of which aim to foster a reading culture and the written word interest among children.

Guadalajara International Film Festival in Los Angeles 
This Festival is an open window to the Mexican and Hispanic contemporary film world and an extension of the Guadalajara International Film Festival. The objectives of this festival are: to increase the access to Mexican and Hispanic films; create a bridge between the Mexican and American film industries; to foster collaborations between international filmmakers; and to enhance the presence of Mexican and Hispanic films in the United States of America.

Channel 31.2 in Los Angeles 
The programs broadcast on Channel 44 in Guadalajara are also broadcast in Los Angeles on Channel 31.2. The University of Guadalajara in LA aims to get closer to the university's community and the Hispanic society through this channel.

 Notable alumni 
 Alejandro Colunga, painter, sculptor.
 Guillermo del Toro, Academy Award-winning film director, screenwriter, producer, and novelist.
 Pedro Moreno, insurrectionist hero of the Mexico Independence.
 Valentin Gomez Farias, doctor, politician, President of Mexico.
 Ignacio Luis Vallarta, Jalisco State Governor, President of the Supreme Court of Justice of the Nation.
 Mariano Azuela, doctor, author of The Underdogs.
 Ali Chumacero, poet, editor.
 Hugo Gutierrez Vega, lawyer, poet, writer, actor, teacher, diplomat.
 Jose Luis Martinez Rodriguez, President of the Mexican Language Academy.
 Luis Barragán, is considered as the most significant Mexican architect, awarded with the Pritzker Prize.
 Fernando Gonzalez Cortazar, architect, writer, sculptor.
 Jorge Matute Remus, civil engineer, Rector of the University of Guadalajara, author of movement of the "tapatia" telephone company building.
 Lucia Maya, painter, sculptor.
 Sandra Pascoe Ortiz, researcher and chemical engineer
 Barbara Padilla, soprano, runner-up on the fourth season of America's Got Talent''.
 Ximena Puente de la Mora, lawyer, academic, and researcher
 Cristo Fernández, Actor.

University rankings

See also 
 List of colonial universities in Latin America

References

External links

 

 
Forestry education
Educational institutions established in 1792
[[Category:1792 establi